The New Hampshire Battalion was formed when the 1st New Hampshire Regiment and the 2nd New Hampshire Regiment were consolidated into one unit on 22 June 1783 consisting of five companies of volunteers. The battalion was disbanded on 1 January 1784 at New Windsor, New York.

See also
1st New Hampshire Regiment
2nd New Hampshire Regiment
New Hampshire Regiment
5th Continental Regiment

References

External links
Bibliography of the Continental Army in New Hampshire compiled by the United States Army Center of Military History

New Hampshire Battalion
Military units and formations established in 1783
Military units and formations disestablished in 1784